Dolichoderus robustus is an extinct species of Eocene ant in the genus Dolichoderus. Described by Dlussky in 2002, a fossilised worker was discovered in the Rivne amber.

References

†
Eocene insects
Prehistoric insects of Europe
Fossil taxa described in 2002
Fossil ant taxa
Rovno amber